Matteo Ricci (1552–1610) was an Italian Jesuit priest who led Jesuit missions in China.

Matteo Ricci may also refer to:

 Colégio Mateus Ricci, Roman Catholic primary and secondary school in Macau
 Collège Matteo Ricci, a secondary school in Brussels, Belgium
 Matteo Ricci College, Jesuit college program that is affiliated with Seattle University
 Matteo Ricci (footballer, born February 1994), Italian football goalkeeper
 Matteo Ricci (footballer, born May 1994), Italian football midfielder
 Matteo Ricci (politician) (born 1972), Italian politician

Ricci, Matteo